Newton County is a county in the U.S. state of Arkansas. As of the 2020 census, the population was 7,225. The county seat is Jasper.  Newton County is Arkansas's 46th county, formed on December 14, 1842, and named for Thomas W. Newton, an Arkansas Congressman. It is an alcohol prohibition or dry county.

Newton County is part of the Harrison, AR Micropolitan Statistical Area.

History
Newton County residents were divided during the Civil War, serving in both the Confederate and Union armies. John Cecil, who had served as Newton County's sheriff, served as a Confederate Captain. Jasper blacksmith James R. Vanderpool (ca. 1832–1880) served as Captain of Union Company C, 1st Regiment Arkansas Infantry Volunteers, while farmer and teacher John McCoy (1820–1903) served as Captain of Union Company F, 1st Regiment Arkansas Infantry Volunteers. Many Newton County citizens served under each of these men, as well as in other units. As an example of how the war divided families, Confederate Captain Cecil's brother, Sam, served as a sergeant in Union Company D, 2nd Regiment Arkansas Cavalry Volunteers. Violence took a severe toll on the civilian population, and at one point, Captains McCoy and Vanderpool escorted 20 wagons of Unionist families from Newton County to Missouri to seek refuge.

Geography

Newton County lies almost entirely within the rugged Boston Mountain range of the Ozark Mountains where elevations exceed . The Buffalo National River, a popular destination for canoeing and recreation, runs through the county from west to east. Highway 7, which traverses the county from north to south, has been rated as one of the most scenic drives in the region.

Adjacent counties
Boone County (north)
Searcy County (east)
Pope County (southeast)
Johnson County (south)
Madison County (west)
Carroll County (northwest)

National protected areas
 Buffalo National River (part)
 Ozark National Forest (part)
 Upper Buffalo Wilderness
 Mystic Cavern

Demographics

2020 census

As of the 2020 United States census, there were 7,225 people, 2,936 households, and 1,800 families residing in the county.

2000 census
As of the 2000 census, there were 8,608 people, 3,500 households, and 2,495 families residing in the county.  The population density was 4/km2 (10/sq mi), one of the most sparse among county populations in Arkansas.  There were 4,316 housing units at an average density of 5 per square mile (2/km2).  The racial makeup of the county was 99.29% White, 0.00% Black or African American, 0.56% Native American, 0.06% Asian, 0.00% Pacific Islander, 0.09% from other races, and 0.00% from two or more races.  0.00% of the population were Hispanic or Latino of any race.

There were 3,500 households, out of which 32.20% had children under the age of 18 living with them, 60.00% were married couples living together, 7.70% had a female householder with no husband present, and 28.70% were non-families. 26.00% of all households were made up of individuals, and 10.90% had someone living alone who was 65 years of age or older.  The average household size was 2.44 and the average family size was 2.94.

In the county, the population was spread out, with 24.90% under the age of 18, 7.60% from 18 to 24, 25.00% from 25 to 44, 27.60% from 45 to 64, and 14.80% who were 65 years of age or older.  The median age was 40 years. For every 100 females, there were 102.30 males.  For every 100 females age 18 and over, there were 98.60 males.

The median income for a household in the county was $24,756, and the median income for a family was $30,134. Males had a median income of $22,406 versus $17,654 for females. The per capita income for the county was $13,788.  About 15.70% of families and 20.40% of the population were below the poverty line, including 27.80% of those under age 18 and 16.90% of those age 65 or over.

Native residents of Newton County were interviewed in 1970 for research being done by a doctoral student at the University of Arkansas in Fayetteville. A Ph.D. degree was awarded to Bethany K. Dumas in May 1971 after she completed "A Study of the Dialect of Newton County, Arkansas." Results are discussed in two of her published articles/chapters: "The Morphology of Newton County, Arkansas: An Exercise in Studying Ozark Dialect," Mid–South Folklore 3 (1975), 115–125, and "Southern Mountain English" Chapter 5 of The Workings of Language, ed. R. S. Wheeler, Westport, CT, and London: Praeger, 1999, 67–79.

Government

The county government is a constitutional body granted specific powers by the Constitution of Arkansas and the Arkansas Code. The quorum court is the legislative branch of the county government and controls all spending and revenue collection. Representatives are called justices of the peace and are elected from county districts every even-numbered year. The number of districts in a county vary from nine to fifteen, and district boundaries are drawn by the county election commission. The Newton County Quorum Court has nine members. Presiding over quorum court meetings is the county judge, who serves as the chief operating officer of the county. The county judge is elected at-large and does not vote in quorum court business, although capable of vetoing quorum court decisions.

Politics
Along with adjacent Searcy County, Newton is unique among Arkansas counties in being traditionally Republican in political leanings even during the overwhelmingly Democratic "Solid South" era. This Republicanism resulted from their historical paucity of slaves, in turn created by infertile soils unsuitable for intensive cotton farming, and produced support for the Union during the Civil War. These were the only two counties in Arkansas to be won by Alf Landon in 1936, Wendell Willkie in 1940, Charles Evans Hughes in 1916, and even Calvin Coolidge in 1924. Since the Civil War the only Democrats to gain an absolute majority of Newton County's vote have been Franklin D. Roosevelt in 1932 and Jimmy Carter in 1976. In 2008, the Socialism and Liberation candidate, Gloria La Riva, had the notable achievement of winning the precinct of Murray, ahead of major party candidates Barack Obama and John McCain. The Republican nominee has received over sixty percent in all Presidential elections from 2000 to 2020 inclusive. In 2016, Newton County voted over 76 percent for Donald Trump, while Hillary Clinton received just 18 percent.

The county is in Arkansas's 1st congressional district, which from Reconstruction until 2010 sent only Democrats to the U.S. House. That year, it elected Republican Rick Crawford, who currently holds the seat as of 2021. In the Arkansas House of Representatives Newton County is represented by second-term Republican David Branscum from the 83rd (and formerly the 90th prior to 2013) district.
The state senator, Missy Thomas Irvin, is also a Republican, serving her second term from the 18th district.

Attractions
24 Hours of Horseshoe Hell (24HHH) is an annual rock-climbing competition held at Horseshoe Canyon Ranch in Newton County. Using difficulty ratings based on the Yosemite Decimal System, teams of two attempt to climb as many routes as possible in 24 hours. The sandstone walls of the canyon has over 411 established routes. The event was first held in 2006, and was rated by Climbing magazine as one of the most difficult endurance events in the nation.

Communities

City
Jasper (county seat)

Town
Western Grove

Census-designated place
 Deer
 Mount Judea
 Ponca
 Wayton

Other unincorporated communities

Bass
Ben Hur
Compton
Fallsville
Hasty
Marble Falls
Mossville
Piercetown
Parthenon
Vendor

Townships

Infrastructure

Major highways

 U.S. Highway 65
 Arkansas Highway 7
 Arkansas Highway 16
 Arkansas Highway 21
 Arkansas Highway 43
 Arkansas Highway 74
 Arkansas Highway 123

See also
 List of lakes in Newton County, Arkansas
 National Register of Historic Places listings in Newton County, Arkansas

References

External links
 Map of Newtown County from the U. S. Census Bureau
 Map of Newton County from the Encyclopedia of Arkansas
 Newton County entry in the Encyclopedia of Arkansas
 Jasper/Newton County Chamber of Commerce
 Newton County Historical Society
 Newton County Scrap book
 24 Hours of Horseshoe Hell
 Newton County Sheriff

 
1842 establishments in Arkansas
Populated places established in 1842
Harrison, Arkansas micropolitan area